Washington Local School District may refer to:

Washington Court House City School District, Fayette County, Ohio
Washington Local School District (Lucas County), Lucas County, Ohio

See also

 Washington School District (disambiguation)
 Washington School (disambiguation)
 Washington (disambiguation)